Kasab may refer to:

Kasab or Kessab, a town in Syria
Kasab, Iran, a village in Sistan and Baluchestan Province, Iran
Ajmal Kasab, a Pakistani militant who was involved in the 2008 Mumbai attacks; he was later executed by the Indian government
Khaled Kasab Mahameed, an Israeli Arab lawyer, founder of the Arab Institute for Holocaust Research and Education
Khasab, a place in Oman

See also
Kassab (disambiguation)
Qasab (disambiguation)